Miles McCarthy (1874–1928) was a Canadian stage actor who went on to appear in a number of silent films. He is sometimes credited as Myles McCarthy.

Selected filmography
 Fear Not (1917)
 The Silence Sellers (1917)
 The False Code (1919)
 A Man's Fight (1919)
 The Green Flame (1920)
 The Tiger's Coat (1920)
 The House of Whispers (1920)
 Smiles Are Trumps (1922)
 Dollar Devils (1923)
 The Day of Faith (1923)
 Abraham Lincoln (1924)
 The Night Hawk (1924)
 Oh, You Tony! (1924)
 Captain Blood (1924)
 The Lady (1925)
 Tricks (1925)
 The Heart of a Coward (1926)
 The Racing Fool (1927)

References

Bibliography
 Slide, Anthony. Ravished Armenia and the Story of Aurora Mardiganian. Univ. Press of Mississippi, 2014.
 Solomon, Aubrey. The Fox Film Corporation, 1915-1935: A History and Filmography. McFarland, 2011.
Wlaschin, Ken. Silent Mystery and Detective Movies: A Comprehensive Filmography. McFarland, 2009.

External links

1874 births
1928 deaths
Canadian male film actors
Canadian male stage actors
People from Old Toronto
Canadian expatriate male actors in the United States